Vulcanolepas is a genus of crustaceans belonging to the family Neolepadidae.

The species of this genus are found in Malesia and New Zealand.

Species:

Vulcanolepas buckeridgei 
Vulcanolepas fijiensis
Vulcanolepas osheai 
Vulcanolepas parensis

References

Crustacean genera